Thankful may refer to:
 Gratitude or thankfulness
 Thankful (Aaron Pritchett album), 2008
 Thankful (Flavour N'abania album), 2014
 Thankful (Kelly Clarkson album), 2003
 Thankful (Mary Mary album), 2000
 Thankful (Natalie Cole album), 1977
 Thankful, an album by Jennifer Hanson
 "Thankful", a song by Celine Dion from the album Loved Me Back to Life
 "Thankful", a song by The Louvin Brothers from Nearer My God to Thee

See also
 
 
 Thanks (disambiguation)
 Thank You (disambiguation)